The World Youth Congress is an international event hosted in a multitude of countries since its beginning in 1999. It is for young leaders to come together and discuss world issues.  At the first World Youth Congress, which was held in Hawaii in 1999, about 1000 local and international delegates from nearly 180 countries attended.

World Youth Congress Locations 
1st World Youth Congress Honolulu, Hawaii (1999)
2nd World Youth Congress Rabat, Morocco (2003)
 3rd World Youth Congress Scotland (2005)
 4th World Youth Congress Quebec, Canada (2008)
 5th World Youth Congress Istanbul, Turkey (2010)
 6th World Youth Congress  Rio de Janeiro, Brazil (2012)
 7th World Youth Congress  Honolulu, Hawaii (2017)

The 2017 World Youth Congress, held at University of Hawaii at Manoa, took place from June 17–25. This congress was based around the United Nations Sustainable Development Goals, with different "HUI groups" focusing on aspects of sustainability, including clean energy, and waste management.

Purpose
The World Youth Congress aims to promote youth empowerment and to allow young people to create intercountry and intercultural relations with people from different backgrounds.

References

External links
 Website

International nongovernmental youth organizations